The 2010 Doncaster Metropolitan Borough Council election took place on 6 May 2010 to elect one third of Doncaster Metropolitan Borough Council in South Yorkshire, England as part of the 2010 United Kingdom local elections. The 2010 General Election also took place on the same day.

The election resulted in the Labour Party taking control of the council from No overall control for the first time since 2003 after gaining eight seats overall. After the election, the composition of the council was:
Labour 34
Liberal Democrats 10
Conservative 9
Others 11

Result

Ward results
The results in each ward are shown below. Changes are compared with the previous election in 2006. Spoilt ballots are not included in the below results.

Adwick

Armthorpe

Askern Spa

Balby

Bentley

Bessacarr and Cantley

Central

Conisbrough and Denaby

Edenthorpe, Kirk Sandall and Barnby Dun

Edlington and Warmsworth

Finningley

Great North Road

Hatfield

Mexborough

Rossington

Sprotbrough

Stainforth and Moorends

Thorne

Torne Valley

Town Moor

Wheatley

References

2010 English local elections
May 2010 events in the United Kingdom
2010
2010s in South Yorkshire